Isabel Cristina Mrad Campos (29 July 1962 – 1 September 1982) was a young Brazilian Roman Catholic, declared blessed by the Catholic Church. She served as a Vincentian in her parish, although she never formally joined the movement. In her spare time, she devoted herself to faith. She was often seen doing Eucharistic adoration and attending mass. She wanted to study medicine and become a pediatrician to take care of underprivileged children, but was murdered in her apartment after an attempted rape.

Her beatification process began on 26 January 2001, when she received the title of "servant of God". On 27 October 2020, the Pope Francis acknowledged that she was killed "in defensum castitatis" (in defense of her chastity), approving the ceremony of her beatification, which occurred 10 December 2022.

Life
Isabel Cristina Mrad Campos was born on 29 July 1962 in Barbacena to José Mendes Campos and Helena Mrad; her brother was Roberto. Her baptism was celebrated on 15 August in the local parish church of Nossa Señhora da Piedade in Barbacena; she received her Confirmation on 22 April 1965 in the San José basilica from Archbishop Oscar de Oliveira before making her First Communion at the school that the Vincentian Sisters managed on 26 October 1969.

Mrad Campos, affectionately known as 'Cris', studied at the Immaculata College that the Vincentian Sisters managed, becoming known for her kindness and for her above-average intelligence that set her apart from her peers. During this time, she often helped the poor or the old, providing them with food or other essential supplies. During this period, she joined the Young Vincentians which came under the umbrella of the main group. Her goal in life was to become a pediatrician to care for poor children, also hoping to do this in Africa.

On 15 August 1982, she relocated to Juiz de Fora alongside her brother Roberto to a small rented apartment that was located near the church and school where Mrad Campos was to take her medical entrance examination. Upon moving in, she immediately began cleaning it and purchasing new furnishings. However, on 30 August, she hired the tradesman Maurilio Almeida Oliveira to install a new wardrobe since he was reputable, reliable, and had reasonable prices for his services. The two began having a conversation, however, she grew gradually uncomfortable at his many suggestive comments, asking her to go on a date with him, despite her asking him to finish his work promptly and telling him that she was not interested. He then told her that he needed to leave to get a missing part so that he could install it either the next day or the one after that. After her brother returned, she told him of the encounter.

Almeida Oliveira returned on 1 September but decided to attack her in an attempt to rape her since she had rejected his advances during the previous occasion. He grabbed her and hit her using a chair before he gagged her with sheets and tied her up before he ripped at her clothes. Mrad Campos fought him and tried to call out for help before he raised the volume on the radio and television to stifle her cries. He grew frustrated at her resistance before he stabbed her fifteen times before fleeing in horror. Her brother discovered her later that evening; the investigation determined she was never raped throughout the ordeal but had thirteen stab wounds in the back and two in the groin.

Beatification
The diocesan process opened in Mariana on 26 January 2001 before concluding a decade later on 1 September 2009.  Pope Francis authorized a decree on 27 October 2020 that determined that Mrad Campos had died "in defensum castitatis" (to protect herself as a virgin in a forced attack) and approved for her to be beatified. The beatification took place in Barbacena on 10 December 2022. The postulator for this cause is Doctor Paolo Vilotta.

References

External links
 Hagiography Circle

1962 births
1982 deaths
1982 murders in Brazil
20th-century Brazilian people
20th-century Brazilian women
20th-century Roman Catholic martyrs
20th-century venerated Christians
Beatifications by Pope Francis
Brazilian murder victims
Brazilian beatified people
Brazilian Roman Catholics
Brazilian women
Deaths by stabbing in Brazil
Medical students
People executed by stabbing
People from Barbacena
People murdered in Brazil
Society of St. Vincent de Paul
Venerated Catholics
Female murder victims